Ludwig Baumann may refer to:
Ludwig Baumann, (born 1950), Austrian opera singer
Ludwig Baumann (architect), (1853-1936), Austrian architect
Ludwig Baumann and Company, former American furniture retailer